Mystic is an extinct town in Routt County, Colorado, United States. The Geographic Names Information System classifies it as a populated place.

Description
A post office called Mystic was established in 1910, and remained in operation until 1942. The community took its name from Mystic, Iowa, the former home of a pioneer settler.

See also

 List of ghost towns in Colorado

References

External links

Ghost towns in Colorado
Geography of Routt County, Colorado